Kim Dong-chan (19 April 1986) is a South Korean footballer who plays as an attacking midfielder and forward. 
On 3 January 2011, Kim signed for Jeonbuk Hyundai Motors on a three-year contract.

Club career statistics

Honours

Individual 
Korean FA Cup Top Scorer: 2008
K League 2 Top Scorer: 2016

Club 
Gyeongnam FC
Korean FA Cup Runner-up: 2008

References

External links
 

1986 births
Living people
Association football forwards
South Korean footballers
Gyeongnam FC players
Jeonbuk Hyundai Motors players
Gimcheon Sangmu FC players
Seongnam FC players
Suwon FC players
K League 1 players
K League 2 players
K League 2 Most Valuable Player Award winners
Kim Dong-chan
Kim Dong-chan
Expatriate footballers in Thailand
South Korean expatriate sportspeople in Thailand
People from Gwacheon
Sportspeople from Gyeonggi Province